Kansas was a former unincorporated community in Bartholomew County, in the U.S. state of Indiana.

The community now lies within the boundaries of Camp Atterbury.

History
Kansas was laid out in 1855. A post office was established at Kansas in 1856, and remained in operation until it was discontinued in 1863.

Geography

References

Ghost towns in Indiana